This is a list of regions  of Guyana by Human Development Index as of 2021.

References 

Guyana
Human Development Index
Regions by Human Development Index
HDI